Presidential elections were held in Benin in March 1996. The first round, held on 3 March, saw no candidate gain over 50% of the vote, resulting in a second round held on 18 March. Mathieu Kérékou, a former military dictator who had come second in the first round, was victorious in the second round, beating incumbent Nicéphore Soglo, after gaining the backing of the third- and fourth-placed candidates. Kérékou received very strong support from northern voters, but he also improved his performance in the south compared to the 1991 election.

Soglo alleged fraud, but this was rejected by the Constitutional Court (who had annulled 22% of the votes in the first round), which confirmed Kérékou's victory. Voter turnout was 88% in the first round and 78% in the second round.

Results

References

Presidential elections in Benin
Benin
Presidential